Dean Diego Guezen (born 18 December 1998) is a Dutch professional footballer who plays as a midfielder for I liga club Zagłębie Sosnowiec.

Career

Early career
Born in Amsterdam, Guezen played in the youth departments of AFC, Ajax, ASV De Dijk and IVV before returning to AFC and subsequently moving to Feyenoord. As part of the Feyenoord youth academy, he stated in July 2015 that "Ajax was in his heart", and that he would have preferred to play in their youth academy; a controversial comment as the club is considered to be Feyenoord's fierce rivals. He afterwards played in the youth academy of ADO Den Haag, before leaving in 2018. Guezen then played shortly for Team VVCS in the summer break, a football team consisting of free agent players. His performances there earned him a contract at SC Cambuur, where he appeared at their under-21 team.

TOP Oss
In August 2020, Guezen signed a one-year contract with TOP Oss, coming over as a free agent from the Cambuur U21 team. He made his professional debut on 29 August, in a 2–1 home loss to Helmond Sport, coming on as a substitute for Cas Peters in the 68th minute.

References

External links
 
 

1998 births
Living people
Dutch footballers
Association football midfielders
Footballers from Amsterdam
Eerste Divisie players
Amsterdamsche FC players
AFC Ajax players
ASV De Dijk players
Feyenoord players
ADO Den Haag players
SC Cambuur players
TOP Oss players
PEC Zwolle players
Zagłębie Sosnowiec players
Dutch expatriate footballers
Expatriate footballers in Poland
Dutch expatriate sportspeople in Poland